General Kurt Jahn, aka Curt Jahn, (February 16, 1892 – November 7, 1966) was a German Army general and commander in Lombardy, Italy during World War II. Born in Schmalkalden, Germany, he was captured west of Milan on 1 May 1945 and interned in Britain as a prisoner of war until May 1948. 

Jahn had also been a member of the Baltische Landeswehr during the Latvian War of Independence.

Jahn died in Coburg on 7 November 1966.

Awards and decorations
 German Cross in Gold (18 June 1942)
 Iron Cross of 1914, 1st and 2nd Class
 Clasp to the Iron Cross, 1st and 2nd Class
 Order of the Zähringer Lion, Knight 2nd Class with Swords (Baden)
 Saxe-Ernestine House Order, Knight 2nd Class with Swords
 Honour Cross of the World War 1914/1918
 Wehrmacht Long Service Award, 1st Class (25-year Service Cross) and 3rd Class (12-year Service Medal)

References

1892 births
1966 deaths
People from Schmalkalden
People from Hesse-Nassau
German Army generals of World War II
Generals of Artillery (Wehrmacht)
Recipients of the Gold German Cross
Recipients of the clasp to the Iron Cross, 1st class
Military personnel from Thuringia